Mahesha Thakura or Maheśa Ṭhakkura ( Sanskrit: महेश ठाकुर ) was the King of Mithila in 16th century. He made his capital in the northwest of Sarisab-Pahi and Rajgram. He was also an eminent Philosopher and Astronomer in India during Mughal Empire. He wrote some treatises and commentaries on Astronomy and Indian Philosophy. He was gifted the Kingdom of Mithila for his scholarly wisdom by Mughal emperor. He established the foundation of Khandwala Dynasty in Mithila later called as Darbhanga Raj in 1527 AD on the day of Ram Navami.

Early life 
Mahesha Thakura was born in a Maithil Brahmin family in Mithila. He was the middle son of Rajpandita Chandrapati Thakura. Chandrapati Thakura was Rajpandita (Royal Priest) in Akbar empire. He belonged to Shandilya Gotra in Maithil Brahmin. His mool was Kharaure Bhaur. Chandrapati Thakura was living in Garh Mangala which is presently in Madhya Pradesh.

References 

Astronomers
Mithila
Maithil Brahmin
1558 deaths
Indian royalty